() is a Polish music talent show aired on the TV channel TVP2. The show ran from 1993 to 2012 and since 2019.

In the program, aspiring singers perform covers of hit singles by Polish recording artist bands which are invited to the show (one band/artist each show). The original singer/group chooses the winner who will sing the same song at the main annual concert in Sala Kongresowa at Palace of Culture and Science. The show is currently presented by Marek Sierocki. It was formerly hosted by Wojciech Mann and Artur Orzech.

Revival
In summer 2019, TVP2 confirmed a reboot but with a different format. This reboot features young singers aged 9 to 14 hoping to represent Poland at the Junior Eurovision Song Contest.  On 2 January 2020, it was announced by TVP that it would be used to select the entrant for the Eurovision Song Contest 2020 in Rotterdam.

Winners

Winners of the final SMS voting 
 2007 – Christina Bien
 2008 – Robert Klemens
 2009 – Mariusz Myrcha
 2010 – Marzena Ugorna
 2011 – Marcin Chudziński
 2019 – Aleksandra Nykiel
 2020 – Tomasz Jarosz
 2021 – Tomasz Bulzak

References

External links

1993 Polish television series debuts
1990s Polish television series
2000s Polish television series
2010s Polish television series
2020s Polish television series
Polish music television series
Polish reality television series
Singing talent shows
Telewizja Polska original programming
Television series revived after cancellation
Eurovision Song Contest selection events